The 2021–22 KK Crvena zvezda season was the 77th season in the existence of the club. For the season it's referred to as KK Crvena zvezda mts for sponsorship reasons.

The club won three titles in the season (ABA League, Serbian League, and Serbian Cup), defending all three titles from the previous season.

Overview

Pre-season
At the end of previous season, contracts expired with four players: Marko Jagodić-Kuridža, Jordan Loyd, Landry Nnoko and Duop Reath. All four of them left the club during the summer.

On 29 May 2021, Serbian guard Filip Čović, who spent last season on a loan at FMP, decided to retire at the age of 31. This marked the end of his second spell with Crvena zvezda. He was at the club from April 2018 until he was loaned out in February 2020, and during that time he won an Adriatic League title, two Serbian League titles, and an Adriatic League SuperCup.

On 31 May 2021, the Serbia men's national basketball team's head coach Igor Kokoškov announced 25-player preliminary roster for the 2020 FIBA Men's Olympic Qualifying Tournament in Belgrade selecting  three Zvezda's players: Dejan Davidovac, Ognjen Dobrić, and Branko Lazić. Davidovac and Dobrić made into the final tournament roster, while Lazić withdrew due to health issues. Serbia finished as runners-up, losing to Italy in the final and not qualifying for the Olympics. Dobrić played all 4 games scoring 11.3 points per game, while Davidovac played 3 games with average of 2.3 points per game.

An American guard Jordan Loyd, who was team's best scorer in the previous season's runs in Adriatic League and EuroLeague, was first to leave the club on 14 June 2021 after signing two years contract with Russian side Zenit Saint Petersburg. He left the club after only one season in which he contributed them to win titles in the Adriatic League, Serbian League, and Radivoj Korać Cup. Individually, he was once selected as a EuroLeague MVP of the Week, twice as an Adriatic League MVP of the Round, and was also member of the Adriatic League Ideal Starting Five of the season.

The first two signings of the season were Montenegrin international guard Nikola Ivanović and Serbian forward Luka Mitrović who already played for the club and was the Zvezda's captain during his first spell between 2012 and 2017. They both arrived from Montenegrin side and the club's ABA League rival Budućnost and signed two years contracts with the club on 18 June. Just few days later, on 24 June, Marko Jagodić-Kuridža who played for Crvena zvezda in last two seasons winning Adriatic League, Serbian League and Serbian Cup, went in the opposite direction and signed contract with Budućnost after his old contract with Crvena zvezda expired.

Third signing of the season was American forward Aaron White. He arrived from Greek side Panathinaikos after his contract expired and signed two years contract with the club. On 3 July 2021, club returned Serbian swingman Stefan Lazarević from a loan. He was loaned to the FMP since 2014. He's a product of a club's youth academy with which he won 2014 edition of Euroleague Basketball Next Generation Tournament.

On 3 July 2021, Crvena zvezda announced that they have signed the two-year contract extension with Ognjen Dobrić until summer of 2023. He has been playing at the club since summer of 2016, winning 10 trophies in the process.

On 12 July 2021, two more players left the club. American guard Langston Hall left for the Turkish side Bahçeşehir Koleji after early termination of his contract with Crvena zvezda. He played for the club for one season in which he contributed them to win titles in the Adriatic League, Serbian League, and Radivoj Korać Cup. Serbian guard Aleksa Radanov also left the club for the Bosnian side Igokea. He was part of Crvena zvezda squad since turning pro in 2015 with two loan spells at FMP during 2015–2018 and 2019–2020. During his spell at the club he won 3 Adriatic leagues, three Serbian leagues, an Adriatic Supercup and a Radivoj Korać Cup.

On 14 July 2021, Corey Walden, another American guard who played for the club in the last season, terminated his contract and signed new contract with German side Bayern Munich.

On 15 July 2021, Serbian international forward Nikola Kalinić returned to the club for his second spell. Previously he played for the Crvena zvezda during the 2014–2015 season. Highlights of his career were Euroleague title with Fenerbahçe in 2017 and silver medals with Serbia in 2014 World Cup and 2016 Summer Olympics. Kalinić arrived from Spanish side Valencia and signed two-year contract.

On 19 July 2021, Australian international big man Duop Reath left the club after his one-year contract expired. He returned to his home country and signed for Illawarra Hawks. Also, he was selected as a member of the Australia national team for the 2020 Summer Olympics in Tokyo, Japan.

On 10 August 2021, American point guard Nate Wolters returned to the club for his second spell. Previously he played for the Crvena zvezda during the 2016–2017 season. Wolters arrived from Russian side UNICS and signed one-year contract.

On 15 August 2021, Cameroonian center Landry Nnoko left the club after his one-year contract expired. He moved to the Spanish side Saski Baskonia.

On 16 August 2021, American guard Austin Hollins signed one-year contract with the club. He arrived from Russian club Zenit Saint Petersburg.

Reportedly, the club expressed their interest to sign guards Jerome Robinson, Stefan Marković, Stefan Jović, and centers Tarik Black, Greg Monroe, and Mathias Lessort among other free agents.

September 
On 8 September 2021, forward Nikola Kalinić was elected as a vice president of the EuroLeague Players’ Association.

On 15 September 2021, German center Maik Zirbes returned to the club for the second time in his career. Previously he played for Emirati club Shabab Al Ahli. He was part of Crvena Zvezda squad in 2014–2016 and in 2018–2019. During that time he won 7 titles for the club; three Adriatic Leagues, two Serbian Leagues, an Adriatic Supercup and a Serbian Cup. Contract with him was signed until the end of 2021.

On 23 September 2021, Serbian power forward Nemanja Popović signed three-years long contract with the club. He's the product of the club's youth academy and spent previous two seasons playing for FMP. Together with him another player from the club's youth academy, Serbian guard Marko Gušić, was also promoted to the first squad.

Crvena zvezda opened their Adriatic League season on 24 September 2021 with a 97–61 home win over Split. This was the only game in September. In his first official game for Crvena zvezda, Nikola Ivanović won the MVP of the round honour after erupting for 20 points, 6 rebounds, 6 assists, 4 steals and a valuation of 35. It was the best debut performance in the recent club's history.

October 
Crvena zvezda started their season in Euroleague on 1 October 2021 with an away game against Turkish side Fenerbahçe. Although club had limited squad of only 8 available players due to multiple injuries they managed to battle to a close defeat of 61–57. Crvena zvezda ended the month on 15th place with 2 wins and 5 defeats.

Crvena zvezda played 4 matches in Adriatic League during the October. They achieved 3 wins and 1 defeat, ending the month on the second position just behind their rivals Partizan NIS.

November 
In Euroleague club opened the month with 2 home wins against Panathinaikos and ASVEL, followed by the 3 defeats against Baskonia, Real Madrid and UNICS. Club ended the month in the 13th position.

In Adriatic league club played 4 games and won them all, including the match against their rivals Partizan NIS. Month was ended at the top of the table.

On 8 November 2021, Serbian former international guard Stefan Marković signed two years contract with the Crvena zvezda. Previously he played for Italian club Virtus Bologna. Highlights of his career were silver medals with Serbia in EuroBasket 2009, 2014 World Cup and 2016 Summer Olympics.

December 
On 20 December, the Euroleague Basketball sanctioned Crvena zvezda with a total of 48,000 Euro in fines for incidents that occurred on 14 and 16 December. The club was sanctioned with two fines (total of 11,000 euros) for conduct of a group of people committing acts that show a lack of respect and for the throwing of objects onto the court during the EuroLeague Round 15 home game against FC Barcelona on 14 December. Additionally, the club was sanctioned with two fines (total of 38,000 euros) for the aggression against a visiting team player, and for the throwing of objects onto the court during the EuroLeague Round 16 home game against FC Bayern Munich, two days later.

In Euroleague club played six games in which they achieved three wins and three losses. At the end of the month they were 13th in the league.

During this month Crvena Zvezda played 4 games in Adriatic league and won all of them thus extending their unbeaten record for this season to 10 games. Club finished this year at the top of the table.

Near the end of the month two first squad players were sent on loans. Marko Gušić was loaned to FMP on 28 December, and Aleksa Uskoković was loaned to Mega Mozzart on 30 December.

January 
On 5 January, the Euroleague Basketball sanctioned Crvena zvezda with a 7,000 fine for the throwing of objects onto the court that occurred on the EuroLeague Round 18 home game against Zenit Saint Petersburg on 30 December 2021. On the same day, the club loaned out forward Nemanja Popović to Vojvodina for the rest of the 2021–22 season.

The EuroLeague Round 19 home game against Fenerbahçe Beko scheduled to be played on 6 January was suspended and postponed after several Crvena zvezda team members tested positive for COVID-19, which left the team without the minimum eight players fit to play. Also, the ABA League Round 15 road game against Budućnost VOLI scheduled to be played on 9 January was officially postponed due to COVID-19 outbreaks in both Budućnost and Crvena zvezda teams as well as ABA League Round 16 home game between Crvena zvezda and Igokea m:tel that was originally scheduled for 17 January. Furthermore, two more EuroLeague games were suspended and postponed; Round 20 home game against Real Madrid and Round 21 road game against Žalgiris.

Only two games were played in Euroleague during this month. Club had one win and one loss in them and ended the month in 14th position.

In Adriatic league club played three games and won all three of them. That extended club's winning record in this season to 13 games and won them second place in the league at the end of the month.

On 31 January, club extended contract with German center Maik Zirbes until the end of the season. In the same day draw was held for the quarterfinals of Radivoj Korać Cup that will be held in Niš during the February in which Crvena zvezda was drawn against Radnički Kragujevac.

February 
Three games were played in the EuroLeague during this month. The club recorded two wins and a loss in those games, ending the month on the 13th place.

Furthermore, two games were played in the Adriatic League. Crvena zvezda won both of them, against Mega Mozzart and Zadar thus increasing their unbeaten run to 15 games in a row. This enabled them to overtake Partizan and secure top place by the end of the month.

On top of that, the 2022 Radivoj Korać Cup edition was held between 17 and 20 February. The club eliminated Radnički Kragujevac in a quarterfinal, Mega Mozzart in a semifinal and won their 11th national cup title by beating Partizan in the final. An American point guard Nate Wolters received the Radivoj Korać Cup MVP Award.

March 
Five games were played in the EuroLeague during this month. The club recorded three wins and two losses in those games, ending the month in 9th place.

In the Adriatic League, the club played four games, winning three and losing the eternal derby against Partizan NIS. The club ended the month at the top of the league. 

Nikola Topić, son of a former club's player and coach Milenko Topić, made his first senior appearance for the club on 28 March 2022 in an Adriatic League home game against Krka. At 16 years, seven months, and eighteen days of age, he became the youngest player in club's history to score points for Crvena zvezda in the regional league.

April 
On 1 April, Nikola Topić made his EuroLeague debut in a 82–57 loss to Bayern Munich, becoming one of youngest players to ever play in the EuroLeague at 16 years and 253 days of age.

Club played last three games in this season's Euroleague regular season, losing two and winning one. With that they ended in 11th place, failing to qualify for the playoffs. 

In Adriatic league club won their last four regular season games, clinching top seed for the playoffs and direct qualification for the semifinals in which they will play against Slovenian side Cedevita Olimpija. Nikola Kalinić was named both regular season MVP and member of Ideal Starting Five, while Branko Lazić received Best Defender award.

May 
During the May, only playoff games in Adriatic League were played. Crvena zvezda first won semifinal series against Cedevita Olimpija 2–1, and started final series against Partizan NIS with two home game wins.

June 
Club ended their Adriatic League season by defeating Partizan NIS in final series 3–2. This was club's sixth title in regional competition, tying the record with Partizan. Ognjen Dobrić was named Finals MVP.

Guard Nate Walters went to the U.S. upon the club's approval on personal matters and won't be in the roster for the upcoming Serbian League Playoffs.

On 13 June 2022, forward Filip Radaković officially signed a four-year professional contract, singing his first professional agreement. On 16 June, guard Luka Vudragović and forward Lazar Đoković officially signed their first professional agreements.

Injury reports 
On 11 September 2021, forward Aaron White broke the left forearm after falling following a dunk during a preseason game against Panathinaikos OPAP. The following day the Zvezda announced that White will undergo surgery on Sunday in Munich and that usual recovery is about six weeks. The club canceled two preseason games in September 2021 due to multiple injury reports (Dejan Davidovac, Branko Lazić, Nate Wolters, Ognjen Dobrić, and Marko Simonović). By the end of September forwards White, Lazić, Davidovac and guard Dobrić remained on the injury list, while guards Stefan Lazarević, Wolters and Aleksa Uskoković have different schedule for trainings.

On 2 January 2022, forward Nikola Kalinić tested positive for the COVID-19. Two day later, 11 more players and staff members were tested positive for the COVID-19, including head coach Dejan Radonjić, his assistants Goran Bošković and Nikola Birač, and players Branko Lazić, Luka Mitrović, Austin Hollins, Nate Wolters, Ognjen Dobrić, Stefan Marković, Marko Simonović, and Maik Zirbes. Also, forward Dejan Davidovac was tested positive for the COVID-19 on 8 January.

Players

Current roster

Players with multiple nationalities
   Ognjen Kuzmić
   Andrija Vuković

Depth chart

On loan
The following players have been on loan during the 2021–22 season.

Transactions

Players In

|}

Players Out

|}

Club

Technical Staff 
The following is the technical staff of Crvena zvezda for the 2021–22 season.

Uniform
Crvena zvezda unveiled their new Adidas uniforms for the 2021–22 season on 15 September 2020, on the EuroLeague Media Day.

The following is a list of corporate sponsorship patches on a uniform of Crvena zvezda and uniform designs for the 2021–22 season.

Supplier: Adidas
Main sponsor: mts, Soccerbet
Back sponsor: Idea (top)
Shorts sponsor: None

Pre-season and friendlies
The first three games Crvena zvezda played in Belgrade against FMP, Mega Basket, and CSM Oradea. Later, the Zvezda competed with Bayern Munich, Panathinaikos, and Virtus Bologna at the Magenta SportCup in Munich from 11–12 September. They have won the MagentaSport Cup tournament following a 70–68 win over Bayern Munich in the final. At last, the club would have been played two games in Greece, against Promitheas Patras and AEK. Two days prior the trip to Greece, the club canceled last two games due to multiple injury reports. Instead of them club played two games in Belgrade against Mega Basket and Al Kuwait.

Competitions

Overall

Overview

Adriatic League

Regular season

Results summary

Results by round

Matches
Note: All times are local CET (UTC+1) as listed by the ABA League. Some games were played behind closed doors (BCD) due to the COVID-19 pandemic in Europe.

Playoffs

EuroLeague

On 28 February 2022, the Euroleague Basketball suspended participation of three Russian teams following the Russian invasion of Ukraine. By the end of the regular season, five games with those teams were annulled, and removed from the standings.

Regular season

Results summary

Results by round

Matches
 
Note: All times are CET (UTC+1) as listed by EuroLeague. Some games were played behind closed doors (BCD) due to the COVID-19 pandemic in Europe.

Serbian League

The 2021–22 Basketball League of Serbia will be the 16th season of the Serbian highest professional basketball league. The Zvezda is the 6-time defending champion.

Radivoj Korać Cup 

The 2022 Radivoj Korać Cup is the 20th season of the Serbian men's national basketball cup tournament. The Zvezda is the defending champion.

Individual awards

ABA League

Radivoj Korać Cup

Serbian Super League

Statistics

Adriatic League

Serbian League Playoffs

EuroLeague

Radivoj Korać Cup

See also 
2021–22 Red Star Belgrade season

Notes

References

External links
 KK Crvena zvezda official website
 Crvena zvezda at the Adriatic League 
 Crvena zvezda at the EuroLeague

KK Crvena Zvezda seasons
Crvena zvezda
Crvena zvezda
Crvena zvezda